Hugh Percy Nesham (January 17, 1878 in Kingston upon Thames - June 26, 1923) was a British archer.  He competed at the 1908 Summer Olympics in London. Nesham entered the men's double York round event in 1908, taking 8th place with 643 points.

References

External links
 
 

1878 births
1923 deaths
Archers at the 1908 Summer Olympics
Olympic archers of Great Britain
British male archers